Lawn bowls at the 2007 Southeast Asian Games was held in the lawn bowls stadium in Queen Sirikit Sport Centre, Pathum Thani, Thailand.

Medalists

Men

Women

External links
Southeast Asian Games Official Results

2007 Southeast Asian Games events